Leo Kyllönen (born 22 January 2004) is a Finnish footballer who plays as a midfielder for Veikkausliiga side Ilves.

Career statistics

Club

Notes

References

2004 births
Living people
Finnish footballers
Finland youth international footballers
Association football midfielders
FC Ilves players
Kakkonen players
Veikkausliiga players